Ust-Igum is a rural locality (a selo) in Vsevolodo-Vilvenskoye Urban Settlement, Alexandrovsky District, Perm Krai, Russia. The population was 452 as of 2010. There are 25 streets.

Geography 
Ust-Igum is located 34 km west of Alexandrovsk (the district's administrative centre) by road. Ust-Usolka is the nearest rural locality.

References 

Rural localities in Alexandrovsky District